Saeed Al Ghaith is the former Minister of State for Cabinet Affairs in the United Arab Emirates.

References

Government ministers of the United Arab Emirates
Living people
Year of birth missing (living people)
Place of birth missing (living people)
21st-century Emirati people